{{Speciesbox 
|image = 
|status = VU | status_system = EPBC 
|taxon = Nematolepis frondosa
|authority = (N.G.Walsh & Albr.) Paul G.Wilson
|synonyms_ref = 
|synonyms = 
Phebalium frondosum <small> N.G.Walsh & Albr.</small> 
}}Nematolepis frondosa, commonly known as leafy nematolepis,  is a shrub that is endemic to Victoria, Australia. It is a small, conical shaped shrub with glossy leaves, scaly branchlets and white flowers in winter and spring.

Flowering occurs in winter and spring.

Taxonomy and naming
This species was first formally described in 1988 by Neville Walsh and David Albrecht, the description was published in the journal Muelleria from plant material collected at Mount Elizabeth and given the name Phebalium frondosum. The species was transferred to the genus Nematolepis in 1998 by Paul G. Wilson and the name change was  published in the journal Nuytsia.

Distribution and habitat
Leafy nematolepis is an understory shrub with a restricted distribution, found at higher altitudes between Bruthen and Ensay in eastern Victoria in a variety of habitats, from lower rocky  outcrops in scrub to upper slopes of Mount Elizabeth in tall forests.

Conservation statusNematolepis frondosa is listed as "vulnerable" under the Commonwealth Environment Protection and Biodiversity Conservation Act 1999, "threatened" under the Victorian Flora and Fauna Guarantee Act 1988 and  "vulnerable" on the Department of Sustainability and Environment's Advisory List of Rare Or Threatened Plants In Victoria''.

References

External links

Flora of Victoria (Australia)
frondosa
Taxa named by Paul G. Wilson